National Physical Laboratory can refer to:
National Physical Laboratory (United Kingdom)
National Physical Laboratory of India